John Little may refer to:

Politics
John Little (congressman) (1837–1900), U.S. Representative from Ohio
John Sebastian Little (1851–1916), U.S. Representative from Arkansas
John William Little, Canadian politician
John Fletcher Little, Irish physician and politician

Sports
John Little (American football) (1947–1997), American football player
John Little (basketball) (born 1984), American basketball player
John Little (cricketer) (1927-2004), New Zealand cricketer
John Little (footballer) (1930–2017), Canadian-born Scottish footballer

Other people
John Little (academic) (born 1928), professor and chair of management science at the MIT Sloan School of Management
John C. Little (1874–1957), British trade unionist
John H. Little (born 1941), superintendent of Wentworth Military Academy
John N. Little, president and co-founder of The MathWorks
John R. Little (born 1955), dark fiction writer
John Little (painter) (born 1928), Canadian artist
John Little (writer), Bruce Lee scholar, bodybuilding/conditioning author
John B. Little, American radiobiologist

Commercial
John Little (department store), a retail chain in Singapore

See also
Little John, a member of Robin Hood's Merry Men
Jack Little (disambiguation)
Jonathan Little (born 1984), American poker player